CL class may refer to:

Commonwealth Railways CL class locomotive
Mercedes-Benz CL-Class car